Đorđe (Đuro) Milutinović (also known as the "Montenegrin"; 1774–1844) was a blind guslar, at the time of the First Serbian Uprising. He was known as a trusted messenger of military plans and diplomatic secrets during the preparation and eve of the First Serbian Uprising.

Milutinović was born in 1774 in Grahovo, Nikšić. He lost his eyesight at his age of sixteen or seventeen, and from then on he began to compose epic songs of current events on the gusle. At the time of the preparation of the First Serbian Uprising, he served as an interlocutor among the institutions in Serbia and Montenegro.

During 1813, Đuro was in close contact with Karadjordje. After the fall of the First Serbian Uprising, and the invasion of Serbia by the Ottoman Turks, many refugees were taken from the borders of Serbian lands to be colonized on the large estates of the Serbian gentry in exile in Wallachia, Moldavia, Bessarabia and Imperial Russia. He first went to Graz and then to Bessarabia, with most Serbian emigrants. There, in 1816, he was instrumental in rejecting an offer to settle Serbs en masse permanently in the Dniester Canyon as immigrants. While in the territories now known as Romania, he and other bards brought their songs together with their unique way of singing known as the "Serbian style" or "measure." (This distinctive manner of singing was mentioned in 1551 in Lipova regarding the performance of the Serbian bard, Dimitrije Karaman, who entertained the Turkish beg, Ulman.)

In 1817, he returned to Serbia, where he was seen and valued guest in Prince Miloš Obrenović's Palace, and lived until his death on September 9, 1844.

See also
 Dimitrije Karaman
Gusle
Serbian epic poetry
Filip Višnjić
Tešan Podrugović
Old Rashko
Živana Antonijević
Old Man Milija

References 

Montenegrin musicians
1774 births
1844 deaths
People of the Principality of Montenegro
People of the First Serbian Uprising